Dajimale is a town in the north-central Mudug region of Somalia.

References
Dajimale

Populated places in Mudug